Ringwood railway station is the junction for the Lilydale and Belgrave lines in Victoria, Australia. It serves the eastern Melbourne suburb of Ringwood, and opened on 1 December 1882.

History
Ringwood opened on 1 December 1882, when the line from Camberwell was extended to Lilydale. Like the suburb itself, the station was named after Ringwood in Hampshire, England.

In 1926, a signal box was provided at the station, and was located on Platforms 1 and 2. It has since been relocated to the bus interchange. Signals are now controlled from within the station building on Platform 3.

Stabling sidings are located at the down end of the station. The sidings closest to the Lilydale line were provided in 1973, and were extended in 1978, whilst in 1979, the sidings closest to the Belgrave line and the Bedford Road level crossing were provided. In order to construct these sidings, the Belgrave line was temporarily slewed.

In 1982, duplication of the line to Bayswater occurred, with duplication of the line to Croydon occurring in 1984.

In 1994, siding "A" was abolished. On 31 July 1996, Ringwood was upgraded to a Premium Station. In 1999, a major signalling project took place at the station. The project included new sets of points to replace existing ones, upgrading of all signals and a new back platform constructed (Platform 1). Prior to that, the track on the Platform 1 side was used as a siding, which continued to the Wantirna Road bridge.

In 2015, Ringwood station was upgraded as part of the Eastland Shopping Centre 2015-2016 expansion (Stage 5), with the $66 million project completed in January 2016. The work included a new concourse, the provision of lifts, a reconfigured bus interchange, CCTV and heritage work on the station buildings. The station buildings themselves were not significantly altered, as they are heritage listed.

Incidents and Accidents
In February 1908, EE class steam locomotive 478 overran the buffer stops at the Wantirna Road siding, derailed and toppled down the embankment, ending up level with the road.

Around 1964, an L Class electric loco ran away, crashing through the same buffer stops, and stopping with its front bogie dangling over Wantirna Road.

On 16 October 1989, a Comeng and a Hitachi train set collided 500m east of the station, near the Bedford Road level crossing. The collision occurred on a bend when the 7:11am train from Belgrave, led by Comeng 589M, collided with the rear of the 7:13am train from Upper Ferntree Gully, which was stationary at the time, derailing the Comeng train. 10 injuries were reported.

On 7 December 1992, a Comeng set overshot the same siding as in the 1908 accident, with leading car 392M crashing into and stopping on top of the buffers, near the edge of the Wantirna Road bridge.

On 12 May 2010, an X'Trapolis 100 set ran off the end of the tracks and into a fence in the Ringwood stabling yard.

Facilities, platforms and services
Ringwood is served by Lilydale and Belgrave line trains. It has one island platform (Platforms 1 and 2) and one side platform (Platform 3). Platform 3 and the concourse feature customer service windows, with Platforms 1 and 2 having a semi-enclosed waiting area. Platform 3 and the concourse also have toilets, and there is a kiosk on with Platforms 1 and 2. All platforms are accessible via ramps, stairs and lifts. The bus interchange is located outside Platform 3.

Platform 1:
  weekday all stations and limited express services to Flinders Street
  all stations shuttle services to and from Belgrave
  all stations shuttle services to and from Lilydale

Platform 2:
  all stations and limited express services to Flinders Street
  all stations and limited express services to Flinders Street
  all stations and limited express services to and from Lilydale
  all stations and limited express services to and from Belgrave

Platform 3:
  all stations and limited express services to Lilydale
  all stations and limited express services to Belgrave

Transport links
Kinetic Melbourne operates five bus routes via Ringwood station, under contract to Public Transport Victoria:
 : to Box Hill station
 : to Warrandyte
 : to Mitcham station
 : to Ringwood station (loop service)
  : Frankston station – Melbourne Airport

McKenzie's Tourist Services operates one bus route via Ringwood station, under contract to Public Transport Victoria:
 : Eildon – Southern Cross station

Ventura Bus Lines operates three routes to and from Ringwood station, under contract to Public Transport Victoria:
 : to Box Hill Institute Lilydale Lakeside Campus
 : to Chirnside Park Shopping Centre
 : to Chadstone Shopping Centre

Gallery

References

External links
 
 Melway map at street-directory.com.au

Premium Melbourne railway stations
Railway stations in Melbourne
Railway stations in Australia opened in 1882
Heritage-listed buildings in Melbourne
Ringwood, Victoria
Railway stations in the City of Maroondah